Mark Christopher Milson Porter, MBE (born 12 November 1962 in Ross-on-Wye, Herefordshire, England) is a GP and medical correspondent for The Times. He also presents on Radio 4 Case Notes and Inside Health.  He joined The One Show on BBC One in 2011.

Porter is in general practice in Wotton-under-Edge in Gloucestershire and he lives in the Cotswolds with his wife and two daughters  (born April 1989 and July 1990). He married Rosalind in July 1987 in Axbridge in Somerset.
He is the cousin of Jeremy Clarkson

Education
He grew up in Ross-on-Wye in Herefordshire, and went to the independent schools Monmouth and  Wycliffe College. He studied at University College, London and Westminster Hospital Medical School (now Imperial College School of Medicine) and graduated in 1986. He has been a GP since 1990 and was appointed MBE for services to medicine in 2005.

Media
He joined the BBC in 1992 as the doctor for the morning show Good Morning with Anne and Nick and was there for the show's whole run. He was the health editor for the Radio Times from 1993-2003. He presented the BBC1 programme Watchdog Healthcheck. He took over from Dr Thomas Stuttaford as The Times doctor in January 2009, and is doctor to The One Show (BBC One). He presents Inside Health, a  BBC Radio 4 series discussing health issues, which had its first broadcast on 10 January 2012. He also regularly appeared on 'The Jimmy Young Programme' on Radio 2 answering medical questions from listeners.

See also
List of doctors working in the British media

References

External links
 Mark Porter's website
 BBC Biography
 Radio 4 Case Notes
 

20th-century English medical doctors
21st-century English medical doctors
English television presenters
English radio presenters
BBC Radio 4 presenters
BBC television presenters
People educated at Wycliffe College, Gloucestershire
Alumni of University College London
1962 births
Living people
People from Ross-on-Wye
People from Stroud
Members of the Order of the British Empire